Glenn Nyberg (born 12 October 1988) is a Swedish football referee. He became a professional referee in 2008, has been an Allsvenskan referee since 2013 and a full international referee for FIFA since 2016. Nyberg has refereed 134 matches in Allsvenskan, 22 matches in Superettan and 44 international matches as of 2019.

See also 

 List of football referees

References

External links 
 

1988 births
Living people
Swedish football referees